Hoshyar Khayam is a British-born Iranian music performer, composer, and teacher. He lives in Tehran.

Early life and education 
Hooshyar Khayam was born in 1978 in Bedford, England; to Iranian parents, visual artist Pariyoush Ganji and music composer Masud Khayam. He started studying music at the age of seven and studied music under the supervision of various professors. 

Khayam obtained an associate degree in piano playing in 1996; and a BA degree in music theory in 1997 from Trinity College London; and a BA degree in Iranian music from Iran Arts University in 1999. He has a BA degree in Iranian music from the University of the Arts London.

Khayam has a MA and a PhD in composition and conducting from the University of Cincinnati, College-Conservatory of Music, where he studied under Gao Weijie, Miguel Roig-Francoli, Lee Fiser, Ricardo Zohn-Muldoon, Mark Gibson, Joel Hoffman, Michael Chertock, and Robert Zierolf.

Music 
"… a true blend of Persian and European music…" (Songlines*****) Khayam's music blends influence of styles and music of extreme sources into new merged musical compositions. Khayam's music is often driven from various sources with curiosity towards new sonorities of instruments and instrumental combinations.

Kronos Quartet joined by the American pianist and producer Stephen Prutsman commissioned and recorded Khayam's music in production of Monir (2014) directed by Bahman Kiarostami, a documentary film on the life and art of the Iranian female visual artist Monir Shahroudy Farmanfarmaian. The film has been on show in Guggenheim, MOMA, ICA, TATE Modern, among other contemporary museums, and has been toured in Europe, Asia, and South America. Khayam's original music to Ivanov (2011) directed by Amir Reza Koohestani, a production by Mehr Theater Group, was staged in Lisbon, Campo Alegre, Heerlen, Utrecht, Amsterdam, Zurich, Basel, Hanover, Brussels, as well as in Iran.

Khayam's discography includes over a dozen publications including "RAAZ" (2020, 30M Records) Songlines 5-start choice Best Album of the Year (March/2021, Middle East), "Music for Tar and Piano" (Tehran Records, 2017) chosen Best Album of the Year MUSICEMA, "All of You" (Hermes Records, 2011) Songlines (75th issue) 4-star choice Best Album of the Year (Middle East).

Khayam's music has been performed by Kronos Quartet, Stephen Prutsman, Hossein Alizadeh, Anja Lechner, Aram Talalyan, Todd Palmer, Szofia Boros, Golfam Khayam, Mona Matbou Riahi, Elina Bertina, Evgeny Bushkov, Artur Avanesov, Wayne Foster-Smith, Eva-Christina Schonweiss, Kirsten Ecke, Burghard Toelke, Klara Ausserhuber, Morrison Trio, Scheherazade Ensemble, LSCO Orchestra, Naregatsi Strings, Ukraine Philharmonic Orchestra, Nilper Orchestra, Moscow Virtuosi Strings, and others.

During the period of working on his doctorate degree, he held many concerts including the concert of Khayam's quatrains and the 2005 concert of the Florence Music Festival in Italy led by Professor Jules Hoffmann. In the United States, he taught music theory and composition at the University of Cincinnati.

Works

Orchestral music

Chamber music

Vocal music

Piano works

Works for film, theater, and animation

Education

Awards

Academic activities

Publications 
Five volumes of Khayam's books have been published.

See also 
 2017 in classical music
 Ars lunga
 Hermes Records

Notes

External links 
 Hoshyar Khayyam | Hermes Music Publishing Website
 Introducing Hoshyar Khayyam | Jam Jam Nova website
 Donald Trump travel ban concert duluth orchestra pulls plug show iranian composer

1978 births
Living people
21st-century Iranian musicians
University of Cincinnati – College-Conservatory of Music alumni
People from Bedford
Musicians from Tehran